M.Pire was a seven-member South Korean boy band signed under CMG Chorok Stars. Members were Taehee, Yooseung, Lumin, Haru, Red, T.O, and Jerry. The group debuted on August 1, 2013 with six members. Member Lumin, formerly known as LeeU of F.Cuz, joined the group in October 2013.

The name 'M.Pire' combines the words 'music' and 'vampire', signifying the need for the group to live off of music. M.Pire’s fandom name is Muse (뮤즈), an acronym  standing for: Mind, Understand, Special, and Encourage.

History

Pre-debut 

Taehee and Seo Yooseung (former stage name of Jino) debuted as a part of BB.BBOYS, a male Korean pop trio, that debuted in 2011.  The group released a mini-album 'First Album' and an OST track in 2011, but disbanded in 2012.

Yooseung and Taehee became trainees under Benjamin Entertainment, a subsidiary of CMG Chorok Stars. On May 1, Benjamin Entertainment revealed M.Pire as a six-member group. However instead of T.O, there was a sixth member named Kangon (currently a member of the group M.Peror). They performed as M.Pire for the first time at the "2013 Dream Concert" held May 11 at the World Cup Stadium in Seoul. ahead of their official debut.

M.Pire eventually made their official debut August 1, 2013. With six members: Taehee, Yooseung, Haru, Red, T.O, Jerry. All six members went through 3 years of hardcore training prior to their debut.

2013: We Can't Be Friends, On My Mind 

The group officially debuted on August 1, 2013 with their title track "We Can't Be Friends", a hip-hop dance song, composed by Hong Sung Min and written by Ddori Jang Gun. Their debut stage was on Mnet's "M Countdown".

On the October 16th broadcast of Channel A's 'Star Family Song' former member LeeU of F.Cuz revealed that he had joined the rookie group and changed his stage name to Lumin.
On October 27 an audio teaser of the song ‘On My Mind’ was released through Benjamin Entertainment's Official YouTube account. The song was written and composed by JYJ's Kim Jaejoong as a gift to the group. It was also revealed that member Yooseung assisted in writing the rap verse for "On My Mind". The official comeback track and title song of their second single album "New Born" is "Kkadak Kkadak".  M.Pire will kick off promotions for their fall comeback with a performance on M! Countdown on October 31.

Members 
 Taehee (태희)
 Useung (유승)
 Lumin (루민)
 Red (레드)
 Haru  (하루)
 T.O. (티오)
 Jerry (제리)

Discography

Single albums

Filmography

Music videos

List of awards and nominations

Hawaii International Music Award Festival (HIMAF)

|-
|align="center" rowspan="1"|2013
|align="center" rowspan="1"|M.Pire
|align="center"|Rising Star 
|
|}

Korean Wave Industry Awards

|-
|align="center" rowspan="1"|2013
|align="center" rowspan="1"|M.Pire
|align="center"|Rookie Award 
|
|}

Asia Model Awards

|-
|align="center" rowspan="1"|2014
|align="center" rowspan="1"|M.Pire
|align="center"|New Star Award
|
|}

References 

Musical groups from Seoul
South Korean boy bands
South Korean dance music groups